Kim Yong-wan (March 4, 1927 – February 21, 2008) served as the Vice-President of the Boy Scouts of Korea.

In 1993, Kim was awarded the 225th Bronze Wolf, the only distinction of the World Organization of the Scout Movement, awarded by the World Scout Committee for exceptional services to world Scouting.

References

External links

ppfk.or.kr 

Recipients of the Bronze Wolf Award
1927 births
Scouting in South Korea
Yonsei University alumni
Kyunggi High School alumni
People from Seoul
2008 deaths
20th-century South Korean physicians